Boguchwała is a town in Rzeszów County, Subcarpathian Voivodeship, in south-eastern Poland. It is the seat of the administrative district of Gmina Boguchwała. It was officially granted town status on 1 January 2008. The name of the town means "praise to God".

As of December 2021, it has a population of 6,231.

History

In the Middle Ages, the area of contemporary Boguchwała was located in western outskirts of Red Ruthenia, near the border with Lesser Poland. It frequently changed hands, to be finally annexed into the Kingdom of Poland, by King Kazimierz Wielki (1340). Near Boguchwała, boundaries of three lands met: Sanok Land, Przemyśl Land, and Sandomierz Land, which was later changed into Sandomierz Voivodeship. Boguchwała itself was part of Sanok Land.

In 1375, Roman Catholic Diocese of Przemyśl was established, covering the lands of Sanok and Przemyśl. Its creation spurred the influx of Polish settlers into the mostly abandoned Carpathian foothills. As a result, several parishes were established in local villages. In late 16th century, several villages near Boguchwała  became property of Castellan of Sandomierz, Mikolaj Spytek Ligeza, who was the owner of Rzeszów. The time of relative growth and prosperity ended in 1624, when a Crimean Tatar raid resulted in burning of a number of villages, and deaths of thousands of residents.

In the early 18th century, the Great Northern War brought widespread destruction to Boguchwała  and its area. In 1702, Rzeszów and its vicinity was occupied by Swedish forces, which plundered the town. In 1704, Swedes were replaced by Saxon troops, which also robbed local residents. Further destruction was brought in 1715–16, during civil war known as Tarnogrod Confederation.

In 1724, Duke Teodor Lubomirski named Boguchwała  main center of his estate, creating the so-called "Boguchwała  State". Lubomirski wanted Boguchwała  to compete with Rzeszów, and due to his efforts, the village received town charter in 1728, together with a new Rococo-style church. In 1772, after the first partition of Poland, the government of Austrian Galicia voided this decision and Boguchwała  lost its town status. Before that happened, in early 1740s, Teodor Lubomirski expanded his manor house, turning it into a Baroque palace complex, with a spacious park.

Boguchwała  remained in the Habsburg Empire until late 1918. In 1895, the village received rail station, along the newly built line from Rzeszów to Jasło. In the Second Polish Republic, Boguchwała  was part of Lwów Voivodeship. In spring of 1939, construction of the ZAPEL plant ended, part of the Central Industrial Region.

The Wehrmacht entered Boguchwała  on September 6, 1939. The village was an important outpost of the Home Army, and local AK unit took part in the Operation Tempest.

Boguchwała recovered its town charter on 1 January 2008.

Transport

Road transport
National road 19, which is a part of the european route E371, passes through the town.

Rail transport
Railway line 106 (Jasło - Rzeszów Główny) passes through the town.

Economy
The town is a local centre of the electro-technical and energy industry with ZAPEL and Instytut Energetyki companies based in the town.

Main sights
 Palace and park complex
 St. Stanisław Church (18th century)
 Monument of the 500th anniversary of the Battle of Grunwald

Sports
Izolator Boguchwała association football club plays at the Izo Arena.

References

External links

  

Cities and towns in Podkarpackie Voivodeship
Rzeszów County
Lwów Voivodeship